A civil society campaign is one that is intended to mobilize public support and use democratic tools such as lobbying in order to instigate social change. Civil society campaigns can seek local, national or international objectives. They can be run by dedicated single-issue groups such as Baby Milk Action, or by professional non-governmental organisations (NGOs), such as the World Development Movement, who may have several campaigns running at any one time. Larger coalition campaigns such as 2005's Make Poverty History may involve a combination of NGOs.

Effective campaigning can sometimes achieve much more than good works or giving to charity. For example, the Jubilee 2000 debt campaign persuaded G7 governments to cancel $100 billion of debt owned by poor countries, releasing more money for development than 1,000 years of Christian Aid in weeks. In the UK, ASH (Action on Smoking and Health)’s campaign for a ban on smoking in public places in 2006 saved over 2,000 lives and billions of pounds a year. The Empty Homes Agency is working with UK local authorities to bring thousands of properties into use as a result of a successful amendment to the UK Housing Act 2004.

Campaigning is increasingly recognised as an important way for NGOs to achieve their objectives. Many charities employ campaigners, produce campaigning materials and train their supporters to campaign. The Charity Commission for England and Wales says that “charities may undertake campaigning and political activity as a positive way of furthering or supporting their purposes.”

Some organisations, such as the Centre for Policy Studies, want to keep charities and community groups out of politics. Many NGOs and community groups are wary of campaigning. They worry about being political or offending their funders.

The problems voluntary organisations deal with often need political action, as well as good works. Over 200 years ago there were charities for the welfare of slaves, but abolishing the institution of slavery was also necessary. There is still a lot wrong with the world about which to campaign. Not all problems can be solved by campaigning. Sometimes it is better to provide a service, as a private business, a social enterprise or a charity. But many problems are best solved by influencing the policies and actions of an industry, firm, public service or government rather than trying to fix them yourself.

Most campaigns are small, such as improving play space in a park, creating access for people with disabilities or changing work practices. Some tackle very big issues, like climate change, world poverty and injustice. Many campaigns do not get anywhere or make very slow progress. Some even undermine their own cause, because they turn people off or make mistakes. Influencing others takes skill and knowledge as well as commitment.

Lobbying 
A key element of campaigning is researching and offering policy suggestions. A campaigning organisation will usually attempt to keep track of legislative processes, and mobilise its supporter base to provide mass lobbies at critical junctures. [1]

Stunts and actions 
While civil society campaigners may come from a range of political backgrounds, modern campaigning owes its largest debt to the ideas of the Situationists, such as Guy Debord, who recognised that as society falls increasingly under the thrall of the spectacle, it is impossible to generate political momentum without existing in the visual plane.
A frequent tactic of civil society campaigns is thus the deployment of high-profile stunts and actions to draw attention to their cause. An example of a stunt is the group Fathers4Justice dressing as popular superheroes and scaling tall buildings to draw attention to their cause. The occupation of the Brent Spar platform by Greenpeace to prevent Shell dumping it at sea was an action rather than a stunt as it had intrinsic influence as well as generating publicity. [2]

Direct Action 
Direct action is politically motivated activity undertaken by individuals, groups, or governments to achieve political goals outside of normal social/political channels.

Human Rights 
Human rights refer to the "basic rights and freedoms to which all humans are entitled." Campaigners use the Human Rights Act, such as the right to life and liberty, freedom of expression, to further their cause.

Transnational advocacy networks
Margaret E. Keck and Kathryn Sikkink, in Activists Beyond Borders, define transnational advocacy networks as "networks of activists, distinguishable largely by the centrality of principled ideas or values in motivating their formation." This definition can be seen in many human rights organizations.

Keck and Sikkink write from a context before the universal availability of information technology and at this point the main actors are the States. The boomerang pattern, argued by Keck and Sikkink, is a model of advocacy where a State A causes "blockage" by not protecting or violating rights.  Non-state actors provide other non-state actors from a State B with information about the blockage and those non-state actors inform State B.  State B places pressure on State A and/or has intergovernmental organizations place pressure on State A to change its policies.

In order to facilitate transnational advocacy networks, the network needs to have common values and principles, access to information and be able to effectively use that information, believe their efforts will cause change and effectively frame their values. Information use is historically very important to human rights organizations. Human rights methodology is considered "promoting change by promoting facts."  By using facts, state and non-state actors can use that viable information to pressure human rights violators.

Human rights advocacy networks focus on either countries or issues by targeting particular audiences in order to gain support.  To gain audience support human rights organizations need to cultivate relationships through networking, have access to resources and maintain an institutional structure.

Activists commonly use four tactics in their advocacy efforts: 1) Information politics provides comprehensive and useful information on an issue that otherwise might not be heard from sources who otherwise might be overlooked; 2) Symbolic politics uses powerful symbolic events as a way to increase awareness surrounding an issue; 3) Leverage politics utilizes material leverage (examples such as goods, money, or votes), moral leverage (the "mobilization of shame") or both in order to gain influence over more powerful actors; 4) Accountability politics holds those who make commitments to a cause accountable for their actions or lack thereof.

Information technology and networked advocacy
The widespread availability of the internet, mobile telephones, and related communications technologies enabling users to overcome the transaction costs of collective action has begun to change the previous models of advocacy.

Due to information technology and its ability to provide an abundance of information, there are fewer to no costs for group forming. Coordination is now much easier for human rights organizations to track human rights violators and use the information to advocate for those in need.

One effect is that it is harder for governments to block information they do not want their citizens to obtain.  The increase in technology makes it nearly impossible for information not to penetrate everyone around the globe making it easier for human rights organizations to monitor and ensure rights are being protected.

In addition, the fact that the Internet provides a platform for easy group forming, the use of an institutional organization is not essential.  With social networking sites and blogs, any individual can perpetuate collective action with the right tools and audience.  The need for a hierarchy is diminishing with the great abundance of information available.

Using the Arts 
Some campaigners use the arts to get their message across. For example, radical cheerleading is used at demonstrations to promote a radical message in a media-friendly, people-friendly way.

Demonstrations 
A demonstration is a form of nonviolent action by groups of people in favor of a political or other cause, normally consisting of walking in a march and a meeting (rally) to hear speakers

Petitions 
A petition is a request to change something, most commonly made to a government official or public entity

Social media 
The use of social media is helping campaigners to recruit members and communicate.  Social media can take many different forms, including Internet forums, weblogs, social blogs, wikis, podcasts, pictures and video.

Influencing Parliament 
In the UK, Parliamentary Outreach works with NGOs to help them to understand Parliamentary processes

Freedom of Information Legislation 
Campaigners can now use Freedom of Information legislation to request Government held information and receive it freely or at minimum cost.

References 

Activism
Civil society